Peringammala  is a village in Thiruvananthapuram district in the state of Kerala, India. It is 3 km away from Venganoor and Pallichal. There are two places named Peringammala in Trivandrum city, the other Peringamala is the second largest panchayat in Kerala.

Demographics
 India census, Kalliyoor had a population of 36836 with 18176 males and 18660 females.

Educational Institutions
 Iqbal College

Attractions
The main attraction in this area is the Aswathy Movie Theatre. People can also find many restaurants in this area.

Bus routes through Peringammala

References 

Villages in Thiruvananthapuram district